North Attleborough High School is a public high school in North Attleborough, Massachusetts, United States, educating grades 9 through 12 with over one thousand students enrolled.

History
North Attleborough High School was located in the current Community School building  until the fall of 1973 when it moved into its current location on Wilson W. Whitty Way.

Notable alumni
Joseph W. Martin Jr. (1902): Speaker of the House of Representatives from 1947–1949 and again from 1953–1955.
Allen Ripley: former MLB player
John Robitaille (1966): Candidate for Governor of Rhode Island in 2010
Chris Sullivan (1992): former NFL defensive lineman.
Anthony Sherman (2007): former NFL fullback
Colin Grafton (2010) Figure skater

References

External links
 H.S. website

1887 establishments in Massachusetts
Educational institutions established in 1887
North Attleborough, Massachusetts
Public high schools in Massachusetts
Schools in Bristol County, Massachusetts
Hockomock League